Thanerocleridae is a family of beetles belonging to the superfamily Cleroidea. It was formerly considered a subfamily of Cleridae, but was recently elevated to the rank of family. The family has 36 living species in 10 genera, which are found globally, mostly in low-latitude tropical regions, though the genus Zenodosus is found in temperate North America. Thaneroclerid species are likely all predatory both in adult and larval stages. They target small fungus and wood associated beetles, and are generally found in places where such beetles are likely to be found, typically tree associated habitats such as under bark, though some species occur in other locations such as termite nests.

Taxonomy
 Thaneroclerinae Chapin, 1924
 Cleridopsis Champion, 1913
 Compactoclerus Pic, 1939
 Cyrtinoclerus Chapin, 1924
 Isoclerus Lewis, 1892
 Meprinogenus Kolibáč, 1992
 Neoclerus Lewis, 1892
 Onerunka Kolibáč
 Thaneroclerus Lefebvre, 1838
 Viticlerus Miyatake
 Zenodosinae Kolibáč, 1992
 Zenodosus Wolcott, 1910
 †Archaeozenodosus Yu & Kolibac, 2017 Burmese amber, Myanmar Late Cretaceous (Cenomanian)
 †Cretozenodosus Cai & Huang, 2018 Burmese amber, Myanmar Cenomanian
 †Mesozenodosus Tihelka et al., 2020 Charentese amber, France, Cenomanian
 †Thanerosus Peris & Kolibáč, 2022 Burmese amber, Myanmar Cenomanian

References

Further reading

 
 
 

 
Polyphaga families